Robert Ernest Harlan (born September 9, 1936) is the former Chairman of the Board and Chief Executive Officer of the Green Bay Packers, an American professional football team.  He is a graduate of Marquette University, where he was the Sports Information Director for many years.  He is also the father of sports announcer Kevin Harlan.

Early life 
Harlan was born on September 9, 1936, in Des Moines, Iowa.

Green Bay Packers 
Harlan started his career with the Green Bay Packers in 1971 as an assistant general manager. Over the next 18 years he was promoted three times, first as corporate general manager in 1975, then as assistant to the president in 1981, and finally as executive vice president of administration in 1988. On June 5, 1989, he was elected as the ninth president of the Packers after the resignation of former president Robert J. Parins. Harlan would go on to serve as president for 18 seasons until 2008. His tenure was marked with "some of the largest moves in franchise history" that made him one of the "most influential—and successful—president[s] in franchise history".

Bob Harlan is credited with keeping the Packers competitive in the era of free agency and the salary cap, and for creating the foundation for the Packers' twelfth World Championship in Super Bowl XXXI.

Among Harlan's most notable accomplishments are:

Building the Don Hutson Center, the first indoor practice facility in professional football.
The decision to move all home games to Lambeau Field, creating season ticket packages for the Milwaukee fans who had previously attended three games a season at Milwaukee County Stadium;
Renovating Lambeau Field into a state-of-the-art facility, with increased game day capacity and a year-round Atrium housing restaurants, the Packers Pro Shop and the Green Bay Packers Hall of Fame;
Launching the fourth stock sale in the team's history in 1997, a mechanism which raised more than $20 million and brought more than 100,000 new shareholders to the organization;
Hiring Ron Wolf, who traded for Brett Favre, signed free agent Reggie White and began the chain of events that led to a World Championship;

On May 26, 2007, the Packers announced that John Jones would be taking an indefinite "leave of absence" only days before Jones was scheduled to succeed Harlan as new CEO of the organization. Health concerns were the major reason cited for Jones' departure. In late July 2007, the Packers and Jones officially cut ties and a new search for the Packers President and CEO commenced. Harlan retained his position as CEO throughout the search, although the President position remained vacant. On December 3, 2007, the Green Bay Packers announced Mark H. Murphy, the Northwestern University Athletics Director, as its new President and CEO effective January 1, 2008. Harlan remained as Chairman-Emeritus and advisor to the team through the 2008 season, afterwards, he remained as Chairman-Emeritus and serve as a goodwill ambassador for the team.

Harlan was inducted into the Green Bay Packers Hall of Fame on July 17, 2004.  Harlan was elected to the Wisconsin Athletic Hall of Fame in 2009.

Personal life 
Harlan and his wife Madeline have lived in Green Bay since the early 1960s and are active in the community. The Harlans created the Madeline and Robert Harlan Humanitarian Fund, which provides assistance to cancer patients who do not have insurance. The inspiration for this fund was Harlan's diagnosis of melanoma and subsequent treatment in 2003.

References

Citations

Bibliography 

Living people
Green Bay Packers presidents
National Football League team presidents
Marquette University alumni
Sportspeople from Des Moines, Iowa
1936 births